Sega is a video game developer, publisher, and hardware development company headquartered in Tokyo, Japan, with multiple offices around the world. The company has produced home video game consoles and handheld consoles since 1983; these systems were released from the third console generation to the sixth. Sega was formed from the merger of slot machine developer Service Games and arcade game manufacturer Rosen Enterprises in 1964, and it produced arcade games for the next two decades. After a downturn in the arcade game industry in the 1980s, the company transitioned to developing and publishing video games and consoles. The first Sega console was the Japan-only SG-1000, released in 1983. Sega released several variations of this console in Japan, the third of which, the Sega Mark III, was rebranded as the Master System and released worldwide in 1985. They went on to produce the Genesis—known as the Mega Drive outside of North America—and its add-ons beginning in 1988, the Game Gear handheld console in 1990, the Sega Saturn in 1994, and the Dreamcast in 1998.

Sega was one of the primary competitors to Nintendo in the video game console industry. A few of Sega's early consoles outsold their competitors in specific markets, such as the Master System in Europe. Several of the company's later consoles were commercial failures, however, and the financial losses incurred from the Dreamcast console caused the company to restructure itself in 2001. As a result, Sega ceased to manufacture consoles and became a third-party video game developer. The only console that Sega has produced since is the educational toy console Advanced Pico Beena in 2005. Third-party variants of Sega consoles have been produced by licensed manufacturers, even after production of the original consoles had ended. Many of these variants have been produced in Brazil, where versions of the Master System and Genesis are still sold and games for them are still developed.

Consoles

Third-party variants
Licensed and unlicensed variants of Sega consoles have been produced by third-party companies. In Brazil, Tectoy created and released the Master System 3 Compact, which may function wirelessly with an RF transmitter. An SKU of this console targeted at female gamers, the Master System Girl, was molded in bright pink plastic. A more recent version, released in 2006 in Brazil as the Master System 3 Collection, contains 120 built-in games. Another Master System variant, built as a handheld game console, was released by Coleco in North America in 2006.

The Genesis was the first Sega console to receive third-party versions. Its first variants were released before any Master System variants, even though the Genesis was released three years after the Master System. Working with Sega Enterprises, JVC released the Wondermega, a Mega Drive and Mega CD combination with high quality audio, in Japan on April 1, 1992. The system was later redesigned by JVC and released as the X'Eye in North America in September 1994. A Pioneer LaserActive add-on pack, developed by Sega, allows the system to play Genesis and Sega CD games. Aiwa released the CSD-GM1, a combination Genesis/Sega CD unit built into a boombox. Several companies added the Genesis to personal computers, mimicking the design of Sega's TeraDrive; these include the MSX models AX-330 and AX-990 distributed in Kuwait and Yemen, and the Amstrad Mega PC distributed in Europe and Australia. After the Genesis was discontinued, Majesco Entertainment released the Genesis 3 in North America as a budget version of the console in 1998. Majesco also released a budget version of the Sega Pico in North America in August 1999.

In Brazil, where the Genesis never ceased production, Tectoy released a portable version of the Genesis with twenty built-in games on December 5, 2007. Another Tectoy variant of the console called "Mega Drive Guitar Idol", released in 2009 in Brazil, includes two six-button joypads and a guitar controller with five fret buttons. That year, AtGames began producing two new Genesis variants in North America and Europe: the Firecore, which can play Genesis cartridges as well as preloaded games; and a handheld console, the Sega Gopher, as well as a dedicated motion console, the Sega Zone, preloaded with 20 Genesis games. Companies such as Radica Games have released compilations of Genesis games in "plug-and-play" packages resembling the system's controller.

References

Sega video game consoles